Grêmio Novorizontino, commonly referred to as simply Novorizontino, is a Brazilian association football club in Novo Horizonte, São Paulo. They currently play in the Série B, the second tier of Brazilian football, as well as in the Campeonato Paulista Série A2, the second tier of the São Paulo state football league.

History
A replacement to dissolved Grêmio Esportivo Novorizontino, the club was founded on 11 March 2001, inheriting the club's colors and logo. After spending its first years in amateur football, the club joined Federação Paulista de Futebol in 2010, but only appeared in a competition of the federation in 2012.

In his first professional year, Novorizontino achieved a promotion from Campeonato Paulista Segunda Divisão, finishing fourth. After managing to survive in 2013's Série A3, the club was crowned champions in the following year, after defeating Independente de Limeira by 5–0 on aggregate.

On 28 April 2015 Novorizontino sealed its promotion to Série A1, finishing second in the tournament.

Current squad

Honours
 Campeonato Paulista do Interior
 Winners (1): 2021

 Campeonato Paulista Série A3
 Winners (1): 2014

References

External links
 
Ogol team profile 

Grêmio Novorizontino
Association football clubs established in 2010
2010 establishments in Brazil
Football clubs in São Paulo (state)